The 2021–22 season was the 97th season in existence of Olympiacos and the club's 63rd consecutive season in the top flight of Greek football. Olympiacos participated in the Greek Super League winning their 47th title (3rd in a row), finishing 19 points ahead of PAOK who came second. Olympiacos also participated in this season's Greek Cup, UEFA Champions League and UEFA Europa League. During the season Pedro Martins became the longest-serving Piraeus coach in a single term. The season covers the period from July 2021 to late May 2022.

Players

First team

Out on loan

Backroom staff

Coaching staff

Transfers

In

(B team)

(B team)
(B team)

(B team) 
(B team) 

(B team) 

(B team) 

(B team) 
(B team) 
(B team) 
(B team) 
(B team) 

 Total Spending: €12.22M

Out

 Total Income: €11.80M

Net Income:  €0.42M

Friendlies

Competitions

Overview

Super League Greece

League table

Results summary

Results by matchday

Regular season matches

Play-off round matches

Greek Football Cup

Round of 16

Quarter-finals

Semi-finals

UEFA Champions League

Second qualifying round

Third qualifying round

UEFA Europa League

Play-off round

Group stage

The group stage draw was held on 27 August 2021.

Knockout phase

Knockout round play-offs
The knockout round play-offs draw was held on 13 December 2021.

Squad statistics

Appearances

Goalscorers 

Own goals: 2

References

External links

Olympiacos F.C. seasons
Olympiacos
Olympiacos
Greek football championship-winning seasons